A comb is a toothed device used for straightening and cleaning hair or fibers.

Comb or COMB may also refer to:

 Comb (anatomy), a fleshy growth or crest on the top of the head of certain birds and reptiles
 Combe or comb, a small valley without a river
 Combing, a method used to straighten fibers for spinning
 Comb drive, a linear motor often used in microtechnology
 Comb space, a topological space
 Honeycomb, an hexagonal wax structure built by bees
 Comb, the raised part of a long gun's buttstock where the shooter rest his/her cheek during aiming

See also
Combs (disambiguation)
Combe (disambiguation)
 Combo (disambiguation)
 Combine (disambiguation)
 
 
 combinatio nova or comb. nov.